Queensland is an Australian state.

Queensland may also refer to:
 Queensland, Calgary, a neighbourhood in Alberta, Canada
 Queensland, Georgia, an unincorporated town in Georgia, USA
 Queensland, Nova Scotia, a community in Nova Scotia, Canada
 Queensland (film), a 1976 Australian film
 Mount Queensland, Antarctica
 45566 Queensland, a British LMS Jubilee Class locomotive
 "That's In Queensland", an Australian rugby league parody song

See also
 Queens Land, a water theme park in Chennai, India
 Queenland, Maryland, a census-designated place in the United States